The 1982 Ballon d'Or, given to the best football player in Europe as judged by a panel of sports journalists from UEFA member countries, was awarded to Paolo Rossi on 28 December 1982.

Rossi was the third Italian national to win the award after Omar Sívori in 1961 and Gianni Rivera in 1969. Rossi was also the second Juventus player to win the trophy, after Sívori in 1961.

Rankings

Notes

References

External links
 France Football Official Ballon d'Or page

1982
1982–83 in European football